is a ruling of the Supreme Court of Canada.

Background
In Canada, holders of credit cards are allowed to use them to make purchases in foreign currency, and the conversion of the purchase price into Canadian dollars follows a similar pattern among all card issuers:

Conversion from the foreign currency through the interbank rate.
Application of a conversion charge by the issuer, which is disclosed by only some issuers to the cardholder.
Inserting the total amount of the transactions onto the cardholder's monthly statement.

In April 2003, Réal Marcotte applied to the Superior Court of Quebec for authorization to launch a class action against several financial institutions:

 Bank of Montreal
 Amex Bank of Canada
 Royal Bank of Canada
 Toronto-Dominion Bank
 Canadian Imperial Bank of Commerce
 Bank of Nova Scotia
 National Bank of Canada
 Laurentian Bank of Canada
 Citibank Canada
 Fédération des caisses Desjardins du Québec

Marcotte alleged that the defendants, contrary to the Consumer Protection Act in Quebec, failed to disclose the conversion charges as part of their "credit charge" as defined under the Act, which would have allowed cardholders who make payments before the due date to do so without paying such charge. In addition, he asserted that five of the banks failed to disclose the existence of the conversion charge, which was also in breach of the Act. It was estimated that the total amount of the charges in question was over $242 million.

The class action became a group of three because of procedural considerations:

 Amex sought to be removed because Marcotte was not an American Express cardholder. Bernard Laparé, who was, joined as co-representative and co-plaintiff. Amex, relying on a ruling of the Quebec Court of Appeal that questioned the validity of the class action, sought to be removed from the action, but its application was dismissed.
 The Desjardins part of the action was separated, as the other banks (who were established under the Bank Act) sought to raise constitutional issues relating the relationship between the Bank Act and the Consumer Protection Act.
 The main action and the Desjardins action were heard jointly, on application of the parties.
 Sylvan Adams instituted a separate class action against Amex with respect to the same issues but also asserted that restitution was due to all cardholders even if they were not consumers. This case was heard by the same judge that presided over the other actions.

The defendants sought to have the actions dismissed on several grounds:

All banks other than BMO and Amex sought to be removed from the action, as Marcotte and Laparé had no direct connection since they held no cards issued by them.
The conversion charges were not "credit charges" as defined by the CPA, but instead fell within the definition of "net capital".
Five of the banks, which did not specifically disclose the conversion charge in their cardholder agreements, submitted that the charge was related to the exchange rate and not the interest rate posted on the monthly statements. The plaintiffs did not challenge the disclosure made by the four other banks.
In any case, all banks submitted that, by paying their balances in full each month, cardholders extinguished any rights they may have had in the matter.
For any accounts created before 17 April 2000 (three years before the commencement of the action), the rules concerning prescription would provide that those cardholders were statute-barred from participating in the action.
The constitutional doctrines on interjurisdictional immunity and paramountcy meant that the COA did not apply, as the Act attempted to regulate activity that fell under the federal banking power, and it conflicted with existing federal legislation.
In the event that these doctrines did not apply, the Code of Civil Procedure in Quebec did not support a claim for punitive damages in the action.
The claims for reimbursement and punitive damages were not capable of being calculated with precision.

In its separate proceeding, Amex asserted essentially the same grounds. In its case, Desjardins submitted that payments by credit card fall within the federal power over bills of exchange, and is thus protected under interjurisdictional immunity and paramountcy grounds.

Superior Court
Gascon J (as he then was), in decisions released on the same day, found for the plaintiffs in all three actions. In reasons that were closely interlinked, he held:

Court of Appeal
The appeals produced varying results. In his reasons, Dalphond JA held:

Supreme Court
The appeals generally went in the plaintiffs' favour:

 In Marcotte (BMO), the banks' appeals were dismissed and the appeal by Marcotte and Laparé allowed in part.
 In Adams, Amex's appeal was dismissed.
 In Marcotte (Desjardins), Marcotte's appeal was allowed in part.

Marcotte (BMO) constituted the main opinion, written by Rothstein and Wagner JJ for a unanimous Court. Their opinions in the other two appeals, while adopting the main opinion's principles, also addressed matters unique to them.

BMO v. Marcotte
{| class="wikitable"
|-
!width=15%|Issue  !!Reasons
|- valign = "top"
|Standing in class actions
|
 The representative plaintiffs have standing to sue all of the Banks. This is authorized under section 55 of the CCP, and accords with the principle of proportionality under section  4.2 of the Code. It is also in line with the approach adopted in the common-law provinces.
 In addition, the analysis of whether the plaintiffs have standing must have the same outcome regardless of whether it is conducted before or after the class action is authorized, because at both stages, the court must look to the authorization criteria of section 1003 of the Code. Agropur Coopérative.
|- valign = "top"
|"Net capital" and "credit charges"
|
 As explained in Richard v. Time Inc., the CPA'''s objectives are "to restore the balance in the contractual relationship between merchants and consumers" and "to eliminate unfair and misleading practices that may distort the information available to consumers and prevent them from making informed choices."
 Treating conversion charges as credit charges would force merchants to either disclose a wide range for the credit rate, which would confuse consumers or require unknowing cardholders to subsidize ancillary services that other cardholders choose to use that would benefit only some consumers at the cost of others and reduce the ability of consumers to make informed choices. Both s. 17 of the CPA and  do not require their classification as credit charges. Instead, they are additional fees for an optional service that is not necessary for consumers to access the credit.
|- valign = "top"
|Interjurisdictional immunity
|
 The doctrine must be applied "with restraint" and "should in general be reserved for situations already covered by precedent." In the rare circumstances that it applies, a provincial law will be inapplicable to the extent that its application would "impair" the core of a federal power. Impairment occurs where the federal power is "seriously or significantly trammel[ed]", particularly in the current "era of cooperative, flexible federalism."
 SS. 12 and 272 of the CPA, which deal with the disclosure of charges requirement and the remedies for breach of same, do not impair the federal banking power.
 While lending, broadly defined, is central to banking, it cannot be said that a disclosure requirement for certain charges ancillary to one type of consumer credit impairs or significantly trammels the manner in which Parliament's legislative jurisdiction over bank lending can be exercised.
|- valign = "top"
|Paramountcy
|
 Under Law Society of British Columbia v. Mangat, the Court held that even though forced compliance with a provincial law would not result in a breach of a federal law, it may nonetheless clearly frustrate the federal purpose and be held unconstitutional. However, the fact that Parliament has legislated in an area does not preclude provincial legislation from operating in the same area. "[T]o impute to Parliament such an intention to 'occup[y] the field' in the absence of very clear statutory language to that effect would be to stray from the path of judicial restraint in questions of paramountcy that this Court has taken since at least [O'Grady v. Sparling]."
 Sections 12 and 272 of the CPA cannot be said to frustrate or undermine that purpose, as they do not provide for standards applicable to banking products and banking services offered by banks. Rather, they articulate a contractual norm analogous to the substantive rules of contract found in the CCQ.
 The basic rules of contract cannot be said to frustrate the federal purpose of comprehensive and exclusive standards, and the general rules regarding disclosure and accompanying remedies support rather than frustrate the federal scheme.
 In addition, sections 12 and 272 of the CPA are not inconsistent with sections 16 and 988 of the Bank Act and so do not frustrate the narrower federal purpose of ensuring that bank contracts are not nullified even if a bank breaches its disclosure obligations. As stated in Canadian Western Bank, "constitutional doctrine must facilitate, not undermine what this Court has called 'co-operative federalism'."
|- valign = "top"
|Disclosure under the CPA|
 The Group A Banks breached section 12 of the CPA by failing to disclose the conversion charges. The violation is not related to the terms and conditions of payment or to the computation or indication of the credit charges or the credit rate, which are specifically covered by s. 271 of the CPA. It is a substantive violation that goes against the CPA's objective of permitting consumers to make informed choices, and the violation results from ignorant or careless conduct.
 Section 272 of the CPA applies, and the appropriate remedy is a reduction of cardholders' obligations in the amount of all conversion charges imposed during the period of nondisclosure. As there is an absolute presumption of prejudice for violations that give rise to section 272 remedies, the commercial competitiveness of the conversion charges imposed is of no consequence.
|- valign = "top"
|Remedies
|
 The trial judgment with respect to punitive damages should be restored.
 Under Cinar Corporation v. Robinson, an appellate court can interfere with a trial court's assessment of punitive damages only if there has been an error of law, or if the amount is not rationally connected to the purposes for which the damages are awarded.
 The threshold for awarding punitive damages is not higher in the context of class actions whose plaintiffs are awarded collective recovery as opposed to individual recovery. The mode of recovery is not a factor set out in the jurisprudence for assessing punitive damages, and it would not be reasonable to include it as one.
 The amount of punitive damages awarded in this case is rationally connected to the purposes for which the damages are awarded. Neither evidence of antisocial behaviour nor reprehensible conduct is required to award punitive damages under the CPA. Rather, what is necessary is an examination of the overall conduct of the merchant before, during, and after the violation; behaviour that was lax, passive, or ignorant with respect to consumers' rights and to their own obligations; or conduct that displays ignorance, carelessness, or serious negligence.
 In this case, the Group A Banks breached the CPA without any explanation for a period of years; that negligence overwhelms their unexplained decision to start disclosing a fee they were charging consumers without their knowledge.
|}

Adams v. Amex
Gascon J's finding of fact was allowed to stand and so his order for restitution remained. As Marcotte did not cross-appeal, the issue of punitive damages did not arise even though Marcotte (BMO) applied, as Amex had breached its section 12 obligations as well.

In addition, the CPA does not apply to non-consumer cardholders and so restitution is founded on the provisions of the CCQ, which the judge properly applied. According to the principles applicable to receipt of a payment not due, the basis for restitution is not the commission of a wrongful act, and the potential remedy is not damages.

Marcotte v. Desjardins
It was agreed that payments by credit card do not fall within the federal bills of exchange power, and the natural limits of its wording prevent it from being expanded.

Reimbursement of such charges is the appropriate remedy, but the rules on prescription mean that some cardholders' claims are now statutes barred, as notice began upon publication of such statement.

The matter was sent back to the Superior Court to determine the appropriate procedure for effecting recovery. It was agreed that Desjardins' behaviour did not justify assessment of punitive damages, as its conduct was neither negligent nor careless.

Impact
The Court held that federal and provincial laws can complement one another, and the fact that Canadian banks are federally chartered does not confer sweeping immunity from provincial laws:

The ruling is likely to affect other federally regulated businesses, as constitutional arguments may be ineffective to immunize them from class actions arising from provincial consumer protection legislation. It may also encourage greater provincial oversight, absent more active federal regulation.

Notes

References

2014 in Canadian case law
Supreme Court of Canada cases
Canadian federalism case law
Canadian contract case law
Canadian civil procedure case law
Bank of Montreal
Class action case law in Canada
Banking case law in Canada